Vladimir Prikhodko (1 March 1944 – 27 November 2011) was a French athlete. He competed in the men's hammer throw at the 1972 Summer Olympics.

References

1944 births
2011 deaths
Athletes (track and field) at the 1972 Summer Olympics
French male hammer throwers
Olympic athletes of France
Athletes from Paris